Hans Lennart Brorsson Lindberg (born 16 January 1945) is a Swedish former professional ice hockey player and manager. He was nicknamed "Virus".

As a player, he played all six matches for the Sweden men's national ice hockey team at the 1972 Winter Olympics held in Japan. As a coach, he coached Team Sweden during the seasons of 1976–1977 and 1977–1978.

References

External links

1945 births
Living people
AIK IF players
Brynäs IF players
IF Björklöven players
People from Gävle
Swedish ice hockey forwards
Ice hockey players at the 1972 Winter Olympics
Olympic ice hockey players of Sweden
Sportspeople from Gävleborg County